The Financial Analysts Journal is a quarterly peer-reviewed academic journal covering investment management, published by Routledge on behalf of the CFA Institute.

History
In 1945, the New York Society of Security Analysts established The Analysts Journal, which in 1960 was renamed the Financial Analysts Journal when the society was merged into the CFA Institute. From 1960 to 2016, the journal appeared bimonthly; from 2017 onwards it has been published quarterly. Since 1960, the journal has been published by Routledge. 

Starting in 1960, the journal has awarded the annual "Graham and Dodd Awards of Excellence" to "recognize excellence in research and financial writing in the Financial Analysts Journal".

As of August 2022, the editor-in-chief is William N. Goetzmann.

Reception
In a 2011 study of academic business and financial journals, the School of Management of Cranfield University gave the Financial Analysts Journal its highest ranking of 4 ("world-leading"). The July 2022 publication (the 68th edition) of the "Journal Quality List", a compilation of ten global ranking surveys of academic journals in the fields of Economics, Finance, Accounting, Management, and Marketing, showed that the Financial Analysts Journal was ranked at the highest or second-highest grade by almost all surveys. According to the Journal Citation Reports, the journal has a 2021 impact factor of 3.273.

Abstracting and indexing
The journal is abstracted and indexed in:

See also
Financial analyst
The Journal of Portfolio Management

References

External links

Finance journals
Publications established in 1945
Quarterly journals
English-language journals
Academic journals published by learned and professional societies
Routledge academic journals